Milka Hartman (11 February 1902 – 9 June 1997) was a Slovenian poet.

She worked as a teacher for home economics in Slovenia and Carinthia.

A number of her poems have been set to music by herself and others.

References

1902 births
1997 deaths
Slovenian women poets
Slovenian poets
Carinthian Slovenes
20th-century women writers
20th-century poets